Qarah Hasanlu-ye Khvajeh Pasha (also Romanized as Qarah Ḩasanlū-ye Khvājeh Pāshā; also known as Qarah Ḩasanlū-ye Qarah Pāshā and Qareh Ḩasanlū) is a village in Bakeshluchay Rural District, in the Central District of Urmia County, West Azerbaijan Province, Iran. As of the 2006 census it had a population of 220 divided into 69 families.

References 

Populated places in Urmia County